Nachum Gutman (as he himself signed; alternate romanisation: Nahum Gutman; : October 5, 1898 – November 28, 1980) was a Moldovan-born Israeli painter, sculptor, and author.

Biography
Nachum Gutman was born in Teleneşti, Bessarabia Governorate, then a part of the Russian Empire (now in the Republic of Moldova). He was the fourth child of Sim[c]ha Alter and Rivka Gutman. His father was a Hebrew writer and educator who wrote under the pen name S. Ben Zion. In 1903, the family moved to Odessa, and two years later, to Ottoman Palestine. In 1908, Gutman attended the Herzliya Gymnasium in what would later become Tel Aviv. In 1912, he studied at the Bezalel School in Jerusalem. In 1920–26, he studied art in Vienna, Berlin and Paris.

Gutman was married to Dora, with whom he had a son. After Gutman's death in 1980, Dora asked two Tel Aviv gallery owners, Meir Stern of Stern Gallery and Miriam Tawin of Shulamit Gallery, to appraise the value all of the works left in his estate.

Artistic career

Gutman helped pioneer a distinctively Israeli style, moving away from the European influences of his teachers. He worked in many different media: oils, watercolours, gouache and pen and ink.

His sculptures and brightly colored mosaics can be seen in public places around Tel Aviv. Indoor murals depicting the history of Tel Aviv can be seen in the western wing of the Shalom Tower and the Chief Rabbinate building.

A mosaic fountain with scenes from the early days of Tel Aviv and biblical stories connected to Jaffa (inscribed with 3 Bible verses: Jeremiah 31:4, 2 Chronicles 2:16, Jonah 1:3), stood for 32 years at the end of Bialik Street, opposite the old Tel Aviv municipality building. In 2012 this mosaic fountain was reinstalled at the southern end of Rothschild Boulevard.

Gutman's artistic style was eclectic, ranging from figurative to abstract. Gutman was also a well-known writer and illustrator of children's books.

Awards and recognition 

Gutman received many art and literary prizes: 
 1938: Dizengoff Prize for painting (also in 1956)
 1946: Lamdan Prize for children's literature
 1955: Sicily Award for watercolor painting at the São Paulo Biennale
 1956: Dizengoff Prize for painting (also in 1938)
 1962: Hans Christian Andersen Literary Prize on behalf of Unesco for his book "Path of Orange Peels"
 1964: Yatziv Prize
 1969: Fichman Prize for Literature and Art
 1974: Honorary Doctor of Philosophy from Tel Aviv University
 1976: Honorary Citizen of Tel Aviv
 1978: Israel Prize, for children's literature

The Nachum Gutman Museum, showcasing the artist's work, was established in the Neve Tzedek neighborhood of Tel Aviv.

Outdoor and public art 
 1961 A mosaic wall at the Chief Rabbinate building, Tel Aviv
 1966 A mosaic wall in memory of the Herzliya high school at Migdal Shalom (Shalom Tower), Tel Aviv
 1976 History of Jaffa and Tel Aviv, mosaic-decorated fountain, initially Bialik Square, now southern end of Rothschild Boulevard Tel Aviv

Published works
Path of the Orange Peels: Adventures in the Early Days of Tel Aviv (English translation: Nelly Segal) Dodd, Mead & Company, 1979
"Seven Mills and Another Station" (Sheva T'khanot ve'od Takhana), Yavneh 1956
"In the Land of Lobengulu King of Zulu", Massadah 1940

See also 
List of Israel Prize recipients

References

External links 

 
 
 
 The Nachum Gutman Museum (in Hebrew and English)
 Nachum Gutman – Illustrates stories of the Bible Exhibition
 The Mosaics of Nachum Gutman

1898 births
1980 deaths
People from Telenești District
Emigrants from the Russian Empire to the Ottoman Empire
Israeli Jews
Jewish painters
Israel Prize in children's literature recipients
20th-century Israeli painters
Burials at Trumpeldor Cemetery
Mosaic artists